Copenhagen Cup is an international Group One harness racing event at the Charlottenlund Racetrack in Copenhagen, Denmark. 

The race was established in 1928 and it was known as Internationalt Mesterskap (International Championship) until 1966. Since 1975 Copenhagen Cup has been held annually on the second weekend of June.

The distance has varied throughout the years, from 1978 it has been 2011 metres. In 1949 International Mesterskap consisted of two races.

Winners 

1 Country of owner

Brief History of Harness Racing
The history of Harness Racing has its roots in the horse racing that began in the 20th century with regular horses, the race also known as trotting. It flourished simultaneously in North America, Russia, France, The Netherlands, Italy and Norway. The sport made its debut with average local breeds, which were working horses. It is said that North America was the mother of Harness Racing. 

It is believed that harness racing that kicked off on a full scale onwards of 1806 in America, gradually developed from locally organized races between the working class farmers with ordinary working farm horses. Following such events, horses bred for farm work were replaced with horses specially bred for speed and stamina.

See also
 List of Scandinavian harness horse races

Sources 
Charlottenlund Travbane/Copenhagen Cup

References

Harness races in Denmark
Sport in Copenhagen
Sports competitions in Copenhagen
Summer events in Denmark